Juan Martín del Potro defended the title by winning 6–4, 6–2 against Richard Gasquet.

Seeds
The top four seeds receive a bye into the second round.

Draw

Finals

Top half

Bottom half

Qualifying

Seeds

Qualifiers

Draw

First qualifier

Second qualifier

Third qualifier

Fourth qualifier

References
 Main Draw
 Qualifying Draw

Estoril Open - Singles
2012 Men's Singles
Estoril Open